Leonid Mikhailovich Volkov (born 10 November 1980) is a Russian politician and public figure, IT specialist, chief of staff for Alexei Navalny's campaign for the 2018 presidential election and subsequently the campaign of the "voter strike", co-founder of the Society for the Protection of the Internet.

One of the founders of the People's Alliance party (later — the Progress Party, the Russia of the Future party), which, due to the composition of its participants, is considered the "party of Navalny". Former chairman of the Sverdlovsk branch and a member of the Federal Political Council of the People's Freedom Party, a member of the federal political council of the UDM Solidarnost. The captain of the Russia-Ural team at the 10th International Young Physicists' Tournament (IYPT) in 1997, a participant in the 2001 World Programming Championship, in which he took 14th place (bronze medals) as part of the Ural State University team.

Biography
Volkov was born on 10 November 1980 in Sverdlovsk, Sverdlovsk Oblast, Soviet Union. His father is Mikhail Vladimirovich Volkov, professor, Chief Researcher of the Laboratory of Combinatorial Algebra, IMKN, Federal State Autonomous Educational Institution of Higher Education "Ural Federal University named after the First President of Russia B. N. Yeltsin". His mother is Susanna Borisovna Volkova (Kupchik), Senior Lecturer of the Department of New Information Technologies in Education, Ural State Pedagogical University. Volkov is Jewish. On official documents however, his ethnicity is shown as Russian.

On March 1, 2009, he was elected a deputy of the Yekaterinburg City Duma in the electoral district No. 10 of the Kirovsky district (self-nomination). Member of the permanent parliamentary commission on urban economy, urban planning and land use and the permanent deputy commission on local government, cultural and information policy.

In 2013 he moved with his family from Yekaterinburg to Luxembourg. He returned to Russia at the end of 2014.

Political and social activities 
Since 2009 — a member of the Solidarnost movement.

He is a member of the central election committee of the Russian Opposition Coordination Council and was one of the leaders of Navalny's 2013 mayoral campaign for Moscow. He was formerly a member of the political council of the People's Freedom Party. From December 2016, Volkov was chief of staff to Alexei Navalny's 2018 presidential campaign.

References

External links
Official site

1980 births
Living people
Politicians from Yekaterinburg
People's Freedom Party politicians
Russian bloggers
Russian anti-corruption activists
Russian whistleblowers
Russian Internet celebrities
Russian prisoners and detainees
Anti-Corruption Foundation
Ural State University alumni
Alexei Navalny
Jewish Russian politicians
Jewish bloggers
Jewish prisoners and detainees
Russian activists against the 2022 Russian invasion of Ukraine
People listed in Russia as foreign agents